This is the results breakdown of the local elections held in the Community of Madrid on 26 May 1991. The following tables show detailed results in the autonomous community's most populous municipalities, sorted alphabetically.

Overall

City control
The following table lists party control in the most populous municipalities, including provincial capitals (shown in bold). Gains for a party are displayed with the cell's background shaded in that party's colour.

Municipalities

Alcalá de Henares
Population: 155,548

Alcobendas
Population: 78,295

Alcorcón
Population: 141,080

Coslada
Population: 73,252

Fuenlabrada
Population: 141,496

Getafe
Population: 139,068

Leganés
Population: 172,729

Madrid

Population: 3,120,732

Móstoles
Population: 189,707

Parla
Population: 69,017

Torrejón de Ardoz
Population: 86,678

See also
1991 Madrilenian regional election

References

Madrid
1991